Kán is the name of a Hungarian noble family which gave bans (governors) to Croatia and Slavonia, voivodes to Transylvania, and palatines to Hungary in the 13th and 14th centuries.

History

The Kán family were members of the Hermány clan. They crossed the Carpathian mountains together with Árpád, leader of the Magyars, and settled in Pannonia in 895. They were Counts of Siklós from the year 900.

Members

Notable members of the family include:

Transylvanian branch

 Julius I (Hungarian: Gyula) Kán. Count of Siklós. Ban of Croatia and Slavonia, 1213, 1229-1235. Voivode of Transylvania, 1201-1214. Palatine of Hungary, 1215–1218, 1222-1226.
 Ladislaus I (Hungarian: László) Kán, son of Julius I Kán. Count of Siklós. Palatine of Hungary, 1242-1245. Ban of Croatia and Slavonia, 1245-1246.
 Julius II Kán, son of Julius I Kán. Count of Siklós. Voivode of Transylvania, 1230-1233.
 Ladislaus II Kán (Hungarian: László) Kán, son of Ladislaus I Kán. Voivode of Transylvania, 1260–1267, 1275-1276.
 Nicholas Kán, son of Ladislaus I Kán. Archbishop-elect of Esztergom in the 1270s.
 Ladislaus III Kán, son of Ladislas II Kán. Married a princess of the Piast royal family of Poland. Voivode of Transylvania 1294-1315. He is thought incorrectly to be the founder of the Lackfi or Lacković family.

Siklós branch

Simon
Buchk (fl. c. 1251)
Nicholas I
Urban (fl. 1281)
Cain (fl. 1281)
Michael
Blaise (fl. 1281)
Peter I --> Beremendi sub-branch
Peter II (fl. 1281–1296)
Stephen (fl. 1293)
Julius I (fl. c. 1251)
Nicholas II (fl. 1266–1288)
Julius II (fl. 1283–1298) ∞ Clara Aba, daughter of Finta Aba
Peter III (fl. 1283–1341) ∞ (1) unidentified; (2) Catherine Kaboli
Siklósi family
Helena (fl. 1298–1336) ∞ James Győr
 a daughter ∞ Peter Tétény

Notes and references

 
History of Baranya (region)